Open Your Eyes is a 1997 Spanish film co-written, co-scored and directed by Alejandro Amenábar and co-written by Mateo Gil. It stars Eduardo Noriega, Penélope Cruz, Chete Lera, Fele Martínez and Najwa Nimri. In 2002, Open Your Eyes was ranked no. 84 in the Top 100 Sci-Fi List by the Online Film Critics Society. 

The movie's intersecting planes of dream and reality have prompted some critics to suggest comparisons to Calderón de la Barca's 1635 play Life Is a Dream. An American remake entitled Vanilla Sky, directed by Cameron Crowe, was released in 2001, with Penélope Cruz reprising her role.

Plot
A handsome young man wakes up to a female voice telling him to open his eyes. He drives to an empty city. He wakes again, this time to a woman in his bed. He tells her not to leave him messages on his alarm clock.

From a prison cell in Madrid, the 25-year-old man, César (Eduardo Noriega), tells his story to psychiatrist Antonio (Chete Lera) while wearing a prosthetic mask. Flashbacks reveal the following events: Good-looking César is attractive to women. At his birthday party, he flirts with Sofía (Penélope Cruz), his best friend Pelayo's (Fele Martinez) date. Later, he takes her home and stays the night, but they do not sleep together. The next morning, César's obsessive ex-lover Nuria (Najwa Nimri) pulls up outside Sofía's flat, offering him a ride and sex. On the way to her house, however, she crashes the car with the intent to kill them both. César survives the crash but is horribly disfigured, beyond the help of cosmetic surgery, so he decides to wear a mask to conceal his face. Sofía cannot bear to see him and tries to keep her distance.

After César's disfigurement, he begins to have a series of disorienting experiences. Drunk, César falls asleep in the street. On awakening, everything has changed: Sofía now claims to love him and the surgeons restore his lost looks. But as he makes love to Sofía one night, she suddenly changes into Nuria. Horrified, César smothers her to death with a pillow. Yet everyone else believes Nuria was indeed the woman everyone else calls Sofía, and he is imprisoned for her murder.

While he is confined to the prison, fragments of his past return to him as if in a dream. It is revealed that, shortly after falling asleep drunk on the street, César signed a contract with Life Extension, a company specializing in cryonics, to be cryogenically preserved and to experience extremely lucid and lifelike virtual reality dreams. Returning to their headquarters, under supervision by prison officers, he discovers they specialize in cryonics with a twist: "artificial perception" or the provision of a fantasy based on the past to clients who are reborn in the future. He committed suicide at home shortly after signing the contract and was placed in cryonic suspension. Duvernois, the L.E. representative who explains César's experiences to him while dreaming, reveals that the era is 150 years in the future and César's time from his awakening in the street onward has been a dream, spliced retroactively into his actual life and replacing his true memories. At the end of the film, César decides to wake and be resurrected by committing suicide. Convinced his life since the drunken night in the street has been a nightmarish vision created by Life Extension, he leaps from the roof of the company's high-rise headquarters, and the film ends, apparently ambiguously, on a black screen with a woman telling him to open his eyes.

Cast
 Eduardo Noriega as César, a confident and wealthy young man who has money and is successful with women 
 Fele Martínez as Pelayo, César's best friend, whose personality is marked by his inferiority complex when it comes to meeting women
 Penélope Cruz as Sofía, César's love interest
 Najwa Nimri as Nuria, César's former lover, who still has feelings for him
 Tristán Ulloa as Camarero
 Chete Lera as Antonio, a psychologist who tries to help
 Gérard Barray as Duvernois, a representative of the L.E. company

Release 
The film was theatrically released on 19 December 1997.

Reception

Critical reception
Open Your Eyes received mostly positive reviews. On Rotten Tomatoes, the film has an 85% approval rating based on reviews from 47 critics, with a weighted average score of 7.39 out of 10. The site's critical consensus states: "Director Alejandro Amenábar tackles some heady issues with finesse and clarity in Open Your Eyes, a gripping exploration of existentialism and the human spirit". James Berardinelli of ReelViews gave the film three and a half stars (out of four), writing that movies "of this intelligence, audacity, and complexity come along so rarely that it's mandatory to cry out their arrival" and that "those who see it will not quickly forget the experience". Rob Blackwelder of SplicedWire gave the film four stars (out of four), calling it "a jaw-dropping psychological thriller" that's "beautifully orchestrated".

Richard Scheib of The Science Fiction, Horror and Fantasy Film Review also gave Open Your Eyes four stars, writing that it is "quite a remarkable film". Holly E. Ordway of DVD Active wrote "I don’t give out “perfect 10” ratings lightly, but Open Your Eyes earns one by all accounts". However, Aaron Beierle of DVD Talk gave a more lukewarm review, writing that he "found most of Open Your Eyes interesting" but remarked that "there's something about the picture that kept me from being completely involved".

In 2016, Alejandro Amenábar said in retrospective that Open Your Eyes was his worst film, telling that it had been written by teenagers, who did not know anything about life.

Box office
In Spain, the film was the second highest-grossing Spanish film of the year behind Torrente, el brazo tonto de la ley with a gross of $7.8 million. In the United States and Canada it grossed $370,720. Elsewhere it grossed $0.7 million.

Soundtrack
Vol. #1
"Glamour" - Amphetamine Discharge (6:03)
"Risingson" - Massive Attack (5:29)
"El detonador EMX-3" - Chucho (5:17)
"How do" - Sneaker Pimps (5:04)
"Sick of you" - Onion (4:28)
"T-sebo" - Side Effects (5:44)
"Flying away" - Smoke City (3:50)
"Arrecife" - Los Coronas (3:11)
"Yo mismo" - If (3:37)
"Tremble (goes the night)" - The Walkabouts (5:02)
"El detonador remix" – Chucho / Side Effects (5:01)

Vol. #2 (Instrumental)
"Abre los ojos" (2:28)
"Sofía" (1:12)
"Soñar es una mierda" (1:04)
"La operación" (1:33)
"¿Dónde está Sofía?" (0:54)
"El parque" (3:08)
"Hipnosis" (2:20)
"Quítate la careta" (2:56)
"Eres mi mejor amigo" (2:41)
"La única explicación" (2:05)
"Quiero verte" (6:38)
"Esa sonrisa" (0:53)
"Deja vu" (1:51)
"Excarcelación" (4:28)
"La vida" (1:46)
"La azotea" (5:21)
"Créditos finales" (3:31)

Source: .

Awards and nominations 

|-
| align = "center" rowspan = "10" | 1999 || rowspan = "10" | 13th Goya Awards || colspan = "2" | Best Film ||  || rowspan = "10" | 
|-
| Best Director || Alejandro Amenábar || 
|-
| Best Original Screenplay || Alejandro Amenábar y Mateo Gil || 
|-
| Best Actor || Eduardo Noriega || 
|-
| Best Editing || María Elena Sáinz de Rozas || 
|-
| Best Art Direction || Wolfgang Burmann || 
|-
| Best Production Supervision || Emiliano Otegui || 
|-
| Best Makeup and Hairstyles || Colin Arthur, Paca Almenara, Sylvie Imbert || 
|-
| Best Sound || Daniel Goldstein, Patrick Ghislain, Ricardo Steinberg || 
|-
| Best Special Effects || Reyes Abades, Alberto Esteban, Aurelio Sánchez || 
|}

American remake
Director Cameron Crowe's film Vanilla Sky (2001) is a remake of Open Your Eyes. It stars Tom Cruise in the lead role (renamed David Aames), Penélope Cruz reprising her role as Sofia, Cameron Diaz as the woman who disfigures David (renamed Julianna Gianni), Jason Lee as the friend (renamed Brian Shelby), and Kurt Russell as the psychiatrist (renamed Curtis McCabe). Transporting the action from Madrid to New York City, Vanilla Sky follows its source material's plot very closely, but makes several changes to the ending.

See also 

 Lucia
 Life Is a Dream (La vida es sueño)
 Lucid dream
 Simulated reality in fiction
 Twist ending
 Ubik
 Vanilla Sky

References

External links 
 
 
 
 

1997 films
1990s psychological thriller films
1990s science fiction films
1990s Spanish-language films
Cryonics in fiction
Films about telepresence
Films about altered memories
Films directed by Alejandro Amenábar
Films shot in Madrid
Madrid in fiction
Films about dreams
Films with screenplays by Mateo Gil
Artisan Entertainment films
Works about plastic surgery
Spanish psychological thriller films
1990s Spanish films